Hiro-Kala is a fictional supervillain, and antihero appearing in American comic books published by Marvel Comics. The character is usually depicted as an adversary of the Hulk. Created by writer Greg Pak and artist Ron Garney, he first appeared in Skaar: Son of Hulk #2 (September 2008). He is the son of the Hulk and Caiera and the twin brother of Skaar.

Publication history
Skaar: Son of Hulk changed name to Son of Hulk with issue #13 and the series saw a change of focus to Hiro-Kala under new writer Paul Jenkins. The series ran to issue #17.

Following the conclusion of this series, he went on to feature in Realm of Kings: Son of Hulk by Scott Reed, with art by Miguel Munera.

The character next features in the "Dark Son" storyline by writers Greg Pak and Scott Redd, which ran bi-weekly in The Incredible Hulks #611-617, the renamed The Incredible Hulk comic book (as it featured Hulk, Red She-Hulk, Skaar, She-Hulk, A-Bomb and Korg), leading on from events in the "Fall of the Hulks" and "World War Hulks" storylines.

Fictional character biography

Shadow Tales
During the explosion that devastated Sakaar, Caiera used her Old Power to protect her womb, saving Skaar and Hiro-Kala from the blast, but landing them in fire. Skaar survives the lava effortlessly, having been born with Hulk's physiology, Hiro-Kala, however, only managed to survive by inadvertently using his Old Power to protect himself.

Soon after his birth, he was enslaved. He was pushed, mocked, and laughed at, until an old man told him about the story of the Hulk, and revealed his goal: to get the Old Power. He snuck out of the Fillian borders, and was stranded in a desert, where he was captured; he remained silent until a monster helped him and killed the two men. He was calmed by a woman who was kind enough to give him food, but Hiro-Kala refused it and continued on his journey.

He came across Hiro-Amin chained and hopeless across an arc. Hiro-Kala freed him from the rock and Hiro-Amin admitted that he knew what the boy was looking for, and asked him to reach into his pocket. Hiro-Kala found a petrified eye of a man who sought the Old Power, and went crazy. Hiro-Amin explains that to get the Old Power, a person must kill someone who is in possession of it. Axeman Bone then gave Hiro-Kala his axe and Hiro-Kala killed Hiro-Amin. A blue beam circled over the sky; it was the Old Power, but it flew away instead of what Hiro-Amin had said. Axeman Bone then granted Hiro-Kala his freedom and became his honor guard. A few days later, Hiro-Kala and Axeman Bone's army went to Okini to hunt Skaar.

Free at last
After some time, the Silver Surfer showed up to warn the people of Galactus's coming. Yenrag and Old Sam joined forces to free the slaves. Hiro-Kala led Old Sam and Yenrag and the rest of the slaves to the battle grounds of the Fillian borders. Hiro-Kala helped the Surfer rescue the shadow slaves, while Yenrag was fighting the guards of Axeman Bone. After the fight, Hiro-Kala noticed Caiera's return. Hiro-Kala and the rest were watching the Surfer and Skaar fight until they saw nothing. The Surfer had sent Skaar to see the might of Galactus up close. Skaar's pride caused him to waste time and to ignore the urging of his mother to evacuate the people of Sakaar.

He chose instead to face Galactus, thinking he could fend him off - against the better judgment of both Caiera and the Surfer. Galactus destroyed Sakaar, absorbing its Old Power, and sating his hunger for an estimated 10,000 years. Seeing the futility of reasoning with her son, Caiera cast her son through the wormhole and toward Earth. In a final spiteful attack, Skaar blasted Galactus with a surge of Old Power, waking him and causing Galactus's hunger for Old Power to surge beyond his control. Now, Hiro-Kala led the remaining people of Sakaar to find a new planet.

Beyond Sakaar
Hiro-Kala and the remainder of the Sakaarian people escaped in the last stone ship, though no one knew how it was to be piloted with no Old Power left. Galactus had destroyed and devoured the Old Power of Sakaar. Hiro-Kala commandeered a stone drone and left the ship, to the amazement of those aboard the ship. Piloting the drone directly in front of Galactus, Hiro-Kala swore vengeance for the destruction of Sakaar. He also claimed to be the son of Hulk the Green Scar, and Caiera the Shadow Queen. While returning to the stone ship, Caiera revealed herself in a trail of Old Power, seemingly sorry for neglecting to care for Hiro-Kala in his time of need, instead reserving her counsel for Skaar. After returning to the stone ship, Hiro-Kala killed one of Axeman Bone's soldiers for questioning his newest claim—he is the Sakaarson, the Lifebringer, and the World Breaker.

Hiro-Kala, commanding the stone ship, followed Galactus's energies and landed on the planet Giausar, the first and proudest of the ancient Shadow's worlds. Though he was warned of the potential for death at the hands of the secretive and exclusive Giausarian people, he was unafraid—telling them he would come to be known as their new god. Hiro-Kala soon subjugated the land of Fractas on Giausar and convinced most of the people there he was a deity. His use of the Old Power on the planet had caused massive destruction and made the planet itself unstable. While the world crumbled upon itself, the other lands of Giausar attacked Hiro-Kala, and soon faced his wrath, costing them their lives. With his unprecedented control of the Old Power, Hiro-Kala turned their own cannons against them.

Galactus's arrival showed Hiro-Kala's true intentions. While Galactus devoured the planet's supply of the Old Power, Hiro-Kala unleashed a combination of the Old Power and the Power Cosmic, causing Galactus to be poisoned. This combination caused Galactus to feel the pain and anguish of every soul he had ever consumed. His addiction to the Old Power will now only lead him to pain and death. Once again he flew to Galactus and cautioned him to be wary that Hiro-Kala may have visited the next planet Galactus planned to consume, poisoning that world as well. Galactus vomited out a blast of souls that struck Hiro-Kala, then retreated into the distance. Caiera appeared once more, and told Hiro-Kala that she loved him, and that though no one would ever know what he did here, she would. Hiro-Kala told Caiera to leave, as she was now only a construct of an artificial, dangerous power—the Old Power. She disappeared as Hiro-Kala cried out in pain and anguish. He sacrificed the world of Giausar to save the universe that Skaar had sent Galactus to devour. Hiro-Kala returned to his ship with the right side of his face badly scarred, telling his crew to locate Skaar.

During their search, their ship fell into the Microverse and landed on the planet K'ai. Learning of his father's exploits there, Hiro-Kala attempted to conquer the planet, but ended up saving the dying world and pulled it out of the Microverse. Hiro-Kala then attempted to take control of K'ai's Worldmind. The Worldmind, reaching into Hiro-Kala's mind, attempted to dissuade him from his path by showing him its memories of the Hulk. The attempt failed, and Hiro-Kala took control of the Worldmind's power, using it to turn the inhabitants of K'ai into mindless slaves. Hiro-Kala then set his sights on Earth, planning to destroy it.

"Dark Son"
As K'ai entered Earth's Solar System, Hiro-Kala mentally connected with his brother Skaar, alerting him of his coming. With that knowledge, their father gathered his allies to stop Hiro-Kala. After the Hulk's forces made it through the starships around K'ai, Hiro-Kala was confronted by his father, the two finally meeting face-to-face. Hiro-Kala taunted his father by killing the remainder of the brainwashed children he sent to attack him, and revealed that he would make K'ai collide with Earth, destroying it and along with it, its Old Power. Outraged by his son's callousness, the Hulk attacked Hiro-Kala. During their battle, Skaar seemingly sacrificed himself to save a barge full of brainwashed slaves from a volcanic eruption. Hiro-Kala mocked his brother's sacrifice, calling him "weak".

The Hulk, angrier than ever, beat Hiro-Kala into submission, but could not bring himself to kill him, instead reverting to Bruce Banner and stunning him with an old power taser. This released Hiro-Kala's Old Power throughout the planet. Skaar, in his old strong form, burst out of the ground, intending to kill his brother himself. Hiro-Kala and Skaar do battle, with Skaar trying to calm his brother down. When K'ai's Worldmind revealed to Hiro-Kala that the image of Caiera he saw was merely a figment of his imagination, he lost his mind, lashing out with the Old Power. Skaar used his own Old Power to seal Hiro-Kala in a sphere of stone, with only his face visible. At the same time, the rest of "Team Hulk" set off an explosion that knocked K'ai off course, saving Earth. K'ai's Worldmind then took Hiro-Kala into the planet's core, so that his Old Power could heal what he almost destroyed.

Hiro-Kala was then transported into the Microverse, magically summoned to K'ai by Jarella's niece, Jentorra.

Enigma Force
Eventually, he returned to life through unknown means, but was later defeated by the Hulk and the Enigma Force. After that, they transferred him to the Microverse.

Powers and abilities
Being born on a war-torn planet, Hiro-Kala is experienced at unarmed combat and swordsmanship. He quickly matured to his teen years, discovered the Old Power, and combined it with the Power Cosmic into a different form known as the New Power. He has immense strength, stamina, durability, agility, and reflexes. His New Power possesses similar qualities to the original set, but on a cosmic level. This allows him to perform various feats, including power bestowal, force fields, precognitive visions, energy blasts, mental control, technopathy, soul rescue, and spatial rifts. Even after Sakaar's destruction, he was able to manipulate the Old Power, apparently from his heritage (Caiera/the Hulk).

Hiro-Kala forsook the Old Power as new energies grew within him. His current powers had been given to him by the planet K'ai. He understood that his own transformations seemed to be harnessed by love rather than hate and rage.

Collected editions

Hiro-Kala's appearances have been collected into trade paperbacks:
 Son of Hulk: Dark Son Rising (collects Son of Hulk #13-17, 120 pages, hardcover, February 2010, softcover, June 2010)
 Realm of Kings (includes Realm of Kings: Son of Hulk #1-4, 336 pages, hardcover, August 2010)
 Incredible Hulks: Dark Son (collects Incredible Hulks #612-617, hardcover, February 2011)

References

External links

Hiro-Kala at Marvel.com

Fictional extraterrestrial–human hybrids in comics
Comics characters introduced in 2008
Characters created by Greg Pak
Hulk (comics)
Fictional characters with death or rebirth abilities
Fictional characters with energy-manipulation abilities
Fictional characters with precognition
Fictional characters with superhuman durability or invulnerability
Fictional swordfighters in comics
Fictional technopaths
Fictional twins
Marvel Comics aliens
Marvel Comics hybrids
Marvel Comics mutates
Marvel Comics superheroes
Marvel Comics supervillains
Marvel Comics male superheroes
Marvel Comics male supervillains
Marvel Comics extraterrestrial superheroes
Marvel Comics extraterrestrial supervillains
Marvel Comics characters who are shapeshifters
Marvel Comics characters with accelerated healing
Marvel Comics characters with superhuman senses
Marvel Comics characters with superhuman strength
Marvel Comics characters who can teleport